The Public Broadcast Laboratory (PBL) was a television program broadcast in the United States, created on November 5, 1967, by National Educational Television (NET). The program was considered a live Sunday-night magazine program. In 1969, the Ford Foundation withdrew support and the series was cancelled.

History 

The Public Broadcast Laboratory had the financial backing of the Ford Foundation, which put over $292 million into educational television programs, including PBL. PBL contained a program of news and other features, in something of what was at the time considered an experimental approach.

The executive director was Av Westin.

The initial PBL program featured African Americans with white-painted faces in a one-hour drama.

Only 89 of a hoped-for 119 stations aired the debut program.  The entire state educational networks of South Carolina and Georgia refused due to the controversial content; both states were embroiled then with social conflict over the Civil Rights Movement.

The series aired 53 episodes (including four specials) during its two-year run on NET.  Season-one episodes ran two hours long, season-two episodes from December 1, 1968, onward ran only 90 minutes long; the program ended its run at the conclusion of the television season.  The entire archive of PBL programs was donated by NET's successor, PBS, to the Library of Congress on January 5, 1994.

Episodes of PBL have been contributed to, and made available in, the American Archive of Public Broadcasting by the Library of Congress, GBH, and WNET.

References

External links
Archive of PBL episodes and segments

1967 American television series debuts
1969 American television series endings
National Educational Television original programming